The ABFC Thaiyak (pronounced “tie-yak”) is a patrol vessel used by the Customs Marine Unit of the Australian Border Force, primarily stationed at  the Ashmore and Cartier Islands and is also known as the Long Term Ashmore Capability (LTAC) vessel. Its name, meaning spear, is based on suggestions from Torres Strait Islander crew members who had consulted with their elders.

Construction
In 2013 Strategic Marine was awarded the contract to build the 40-metre on-station Long Term Ashmore Capability (LTAC) vessel for Gardline Australia Pty Ltd on behalf of the Government of Australia. The vessel was designed by MMD Naval Architects to provide border protection services in Australia's northern waters therefore to be reliable and flexibly self-sufficient for longterm deployment in tropical regions. The vessel employs a steel hull with aluminium superstructure.

It has medical facilities for first aid along with an isolation facility.

Austere accommodation is provided for up to 24 transportees. In addition, sheltered deck space allows for  a short term holding capability for 25 additional passengers.

The vessel was constructed at the Strategic Marine shipyards in Vung Tau, Vietnam  and was launched in March 2014.

Operational history
The Minister for Immigration and Border Protection,  Scott Morrison, attended a naming ceremony for the vessel at Victoria Quay in Fremantle Harbour on 20 June 2014. He said Thaiyak would significantly improve Australia's capability in the detection and response to  maritime threats in Australia's northern waters.

The vessel is not armed but carries small arms  consisting of Glock pistols for Australian Border Force boarding party officers along with other personal defence equipment on board.

References

Ships built in Vietnam
Patrol vessels of the Marine Unit (Australian Border Force)
Patrol vessels of Australia
2014 ships